Os Dias da MadreDeus (English: "The days of MadreDeus") is the debut studio album by Portuguese group Madredeus. It was released in December 1987 by EMI-Valentim de Carvalho.

Recording 
Os Dias da MadreDeus was recorded between 28 and 30 July 1987, at the Teatro Ibérico facilities in the old Church of the Xabregas Convent, in Lisbon.

Legacy 
In 2009, Portuguese music magazine Blitz placed Os Dias da MadreDeus as the 5th greatest Portuguese album of the 1980s, in a list ranking the greatest Portuguese albums of the previous four decades.

Track listing 
LP release (1987)

Personnel 
Credits are adapted from the album's inner notes.

Madredeus

 Teresa Salgueiro
 Pedro Ayres Magalhães
 Rodrigo Leão
 Gabriel Gomes
 Francisco Ribeiro

Production

 Pedro Ayres Magalhães – project concept, artistic production, arrangements, cover concept
 Rodrigo Leão – project concept
 Pedro Bidarra de Almeida – recording production assistance
 Pedro Vasconcelos – recording technician
 Miguel Gonçalves – recording technician
 Alexandre Gonefrey – cover art
 Luís Ramos – photography
 Álvaro Rosemão – photography

Charts

References 

1987 albums
Madredeus albums
EMI Records albums